Sarich is a surname. It may refer to:

 Cory Sarich (born 1978), Canadian ice hockey player
 Drew Sarich (born 1975), American actor and singer
 Janice Sarich (born 1958), Canadian politician
 Ralph Sarich (born 1938), Australian engineer and businessman
 Vincent Sarich (1934-2012), American anthropologist
Shannon Sarich (born 1987), famed transsexual